Propyl chloride may refer to:

 2-Chloropropane (isopropyl chloride)
 1-Chloropropane (n-propyl chloride)